{{DISPLAYTITLE:C18H22N2}}
The molecular formula C18H22N2 (molar mass: 266.38 g/mol, exact mass: 266.1783 u) may refer to:

 Cyclizine
 Desipramine
 Dibenzylpiperazine (DBZP)
 Mezepine